Oidaematophorus phaceliae is a moth of the family Pterophoridae that is found from Yukon to Ontario, south to California and Baja California. The habitat consists of boreal forest.

The forewings are deep fawn-brown, heavily sprinkled with white and smoky scaling. The hindwings are smoky brown with pale smoky fringes. Females are somewhat more heavily marked than males.

The larvae feed on Hydrophyllaceae species, including Phacelia species and Hydrophyllum virginianum. Pupation occurs on the surface of dead leaves of the food plant. The pupa turns dark before eclosion.

References

Oidaematophorini
Moths described in 1938
Moths of North America